The FIS Snowboard World Cup is an annual snowboarding competition, arranged by the International Ski Federation (FIS) since 1994. Since its inauguration, different disciplines have been added and removed, along with categories used to group them.

Currently disciplines contested in the World Cup are: Parallel Giant Slalom and Parallel Slalom (grouped into Parallel category), Halfpipe, Big Air and Slopestyle (grouped into AFU category) and the discipline-category of Snowboard Cross. Most of these disciplines have been contested on and off throughout the years. The only discipline contested in every season of the World Cup is the Halfpipe (and from 1996–97 season onward the Snowboard Cross).

There was an Overall classification until the 2009–10 season. Since then, the World Cup has been divided into the three categories described above.

Men's standings

Existing disciplines and grouped

Parallel (1994–, discontinuously)

Medals:

Parallel giant slalom (1999–, discontinuously)

Medals:

Parallel slalom (2000–, discontinuously)

Medals:

AFU (2010–) Freestyle overall (HP/BA/SS)

Medals:

Halfpipe (1994–)

Medals:

Big air (2001–, discontinuously)

Medals  :

Slopestyle (2011–)

Medals  :

Snowboard cross (1996–)

Medals:

Extinct disciplines

Overall (1994–2010)

Giant slalom (1994–2002)

Slalom (1994–1999)

Women's standings

Existing disciplines and grouped

Parallel (1994–, discontinuously)

Medals:

Parallel giant slalom (1995–, discontinuously)

Medals:

Parallel slalom (1994–, discontinuously)

Medals:

AFU (2010–) Freestyle overall (HP/BA/SS) 

Medals:

Halfpipe (1994–)

Medals:

Big air (2010–, discontinuously)

Medals:

Slope style (2011–)

Medals:

Snowboard cross (1996–)

Medals:

Extinct disciplines

Overall (1994–2010)

Giant slalom (1994–2002)

Slalom (1994–1999)

All-time medal count

Most successful athletes

References

External links

Statistics& Men, Women
Snowboard at FIS-Ski.com
Podium places in the World Cup Women
Podium places in the World Cup Men
Podium places in the World Cup Women / Disciplines
Podium places in the World Cup Men / Disciplines

 
Skiing world competitions
Recurring sporting events established in 1994
Snowboarding competitions
Snowboard
snowboard